The following highways are numbered 739:

Costa Rica
 National Route 739

Ireland
 R739 regional road

United States